John Husband (1839 – 5 November 1919) was a British Liberal Party politician who served as Member of Parliament (MP) for Cricklade from 1892 to 1895.

He was elected to the House of Commons at the 1892 general election, defeating the sitting Liberal Unionist MP.  Husband did not defend his seat at the 1895 general election, and did not stand for Parliament again.

References

External links 
 

1839 births
1919 deaths
Liberal Party (UK) MPs for English constituencies
UK MPs 1892–1895
Members of the Parliament of the United Kingdom for Wiltshire